Vahtre is a surname. Notable people with the surname include:

Lauri Vahtre (born 1960), Estonian politician, historian, translator, and writer
Sulev Vahtre (1926–2007), Estonian historian